The county of Essex (which includes the unitary authorities of Southend-on-Sea and Thurrock) is divided into 18 parliamentary constituencies (sub-classified into six of borough type and twelve of county status affecting the level of expenses permitted and status of returning officer).  The county saw the majority of its population and seats removed on the creation of the county of Greater London in 1965. Since then, the Conservatives have won a majority of the seats in the revised county, with all of Essex's seats being won by Conservative MPs by more than 50% of the vote at the 2019 United Kingdom general election.

Constituencies

2010 boundary changes 
Under the Fifth Periodic Review of Westminster constituencies, the Boundary Commission for England increased Essex's representation from 17 to 18 MPs, with the creation of the constituency of Witham. This had a significant impact on the boundaries of the majority of the existing constituencies and also resulted in several name changes.

Proposed boundary changes 
See 2023 Periodic Review of Westminster constituencies for further details.

Following the abandonment of the Sixth Periodic Review (the 2018 review), the Boundary Commission for England formally launched the 2023 Review on 5 January 2021. Initial proposals were published on 8 June 2021 and, following two periods of public consultation, revised proposals were published on 8 November 2022. Final proposals will be published by 1 July 2023.

The commission has proposed retaining the current number of constituencies in Essex, as detailed below, with minor boundary changes to reflect changes to electoral wards within the county and to bring the electorates within the statutory range. It is proposed that Southend West be renamed Southend Central and Leigh.

Containing electoral wards from Basildon
Basildon and Billericay
Castle Point (part)
Rayleigh and Wickford (part)
South Basildon and East Thurrock (part)
Containing electoral wards from Braintree
Braintree (part)
Witham (part)
Containing electoral wards from Brentwood
Brentwood and Ongar (part)
Containing electoral wards from Castle Point
Castle Point (part)
Containing electoral wards from Chelmsford
Chelmsford
Maldon (part)
Saffron Walden (part)
Containing electoral wards from Colchester
Colchester
Harwich and North Essex (part)
Witham (part)
Containing electoral wards from Epping Forest
Brentwood and Ongar (part)
Epping Forest
Harlow (part)
Containing electoral wards from Harlow
Harlow (part)
Containing electoral wards from Maldon
Maldon (part)
Witham (part)
Containing electoral wards from Rochford
Rayleigh and Wickford (part)
Rochford and Southend East (part)
Containing electoral wards from Southend-on-Sea
Rochford and Southend East (part)
Southend Central and Leigh
Containing electoral wards from Tendring
Clacton
Harwich and North Essex (part)
Containing electoral wards from Thurrock
South Basildon and East Thurrock (part)
Thurrock
Containing electoral wards from Uttlesford

 Braintree (part)
 Harlow (part)

Saffron Walden (part)

Results history
Primary data source: House of Commons research briefing - General election results from 1918 to 2019

2019 
The number of votes cast for each political party who fielded candidates in constituencies comprising Essex in the 2019 general election were as follows:

Percentage votes 

11974 & 1979 - Liberal Party; 1983 & 1987 - SDP-Liberal Alliance

* Included in Other

Seats 

11974 & 1979 - Liberal Party; 1983 & 1987 - SDP-Liberal Alliance

Maps

1885-1910

1918-145

1950-1970

1974-present

Historical representation by party
A cell marked → (with a different colour background to the preceding cell) indicates that the previous MP continued to sit under a new party name.

Key: bulk or all of areas marked † form part of present-day Greater London.

1885 to 1918

1918 to 1945

1945 to 1974

1974 to present

See also
List of parliamentary constituencies in the East of England (region)
History of parliamentary constituencies and boundaries in Essex
Historical list of parliamentary constituencies in Essex
List of former parliamentary constituencies in Essex

Notes

References

Essex
Essex
Parliamentary constituencies in Essex
Parliamentary constituencies